Chris Dunleavy (born 30 December 1949) is an English former professional footballer who played for Everton, Southport, Philadelphia Atoms, Chester, Halifax Town and Wollongong FC.

Dunleavy was voted Chester's player of the year for 1973–74 but suffered a broken leg during their 3–0 win against Torquay United the following season. This meant he missed the remainder of the club's first promotion season, but he remained at Chester until moving to Halifax Town in October 1976 along with Tony Loska.

Dunleavy joined Wollongong City in the Australian National Soccer League in 1981 where he played three seasons with the south coast club.

References

Bibliography

1949 births
Living people
English footballers
Association football central defenders
English Football League players
Everton F.C. players
Southport F.C. players
Chester City F.C. players
Halifax Town A.F.C. players
Footballers from Liverpool
National Soccer League (Australia) players
North American Soccer League (1968–1984) players
Philadelphia Atoms players
Wollongong Wolves FC players
English expatriate sportspeople in the United States
Expatriate soccer players in the United States
English expatriate footballers